is a Japanese gravure idol. She is represented by talent agency Fang. She is from Osaka and interested in tennis, long-distance track events and Western popular music.

She worked with talent agency Artist Box until December 28, 2007.

Profile
 Nickname:           Nothing (Nana)
 Profession:         'Gravure idol' (Japanese term: swimsuit/bikini model)
 Date of Birth:      12 September 1982
 Birthplace:         Osaka, Japan
 Height:             163 cm (5 feet and 4.2 inches)
 Measurements:       B86 W58 H85 cm (B33.9 W22.8 H33.5 inches)
 Talent Agency:      Fang

Bibliography

Magazines 
 "HANAMARU WORK Vol.20 November 2006" (Adluck, 2006) Cover photo
 "Weekly Playboy No.45" (Shueisha, 2006) pp. 223–226
 "FLASH No. 985" (Kobunsha, 2007) pp. 37–44

Filmography

TV Programs 
 FNS Chikyu Tokuso-tai Die Buster (FNS地球特捜隊ダイバスター) Fuji Television
 Kyuyo Mesai (給与明細) TV Tokyo
 Shirosaki Jin to Isoyama Sayaka no Kiwame-michi (城咲仁と磯山さやかの極めみち) GyaO
 Oni Hatchu (オニ発注) TV Tokyo

V-Cinemas 
 Desearter Aoi Zetsubo (デザーター 青い絶望)
 Desearter Akai Kibo (デザーター 赤い希望)
 Gambare Bokura no Gura-dol Heroine (～がんばれ僕らの～グラドルヒロイン エスピリオン)

Image DVDs 
 Koi no Yokan (恋の予感 / The Foreboding of Love), Eichi Publishing 2006
 Nana ni Koi-shite (ナナに恋して / Falling in Love with Nana), Saibunkan Publishing 2007
 Rainbow (レインボー), Takeshobo 2007
 Nana Fushigi (ナナ不思議 / The Seven Wonders of Nana), GP Museum Soft 2007
 Nure-doki (濡時間 / Wet Time), Goma Books 2008
 Toriko (とりこ / Enslaved), Outvision 2009

References

External links 
Nana Ozaki's Nanairo Diary  - Official Blog with her photographs, since December 2006
Nana Ozaki's Nanairo Diary♪  - Official Blog with her photographs, from September to November 2006
 Sample Images of Nana Ozaki - At "Schoolgirl Milk Kiss"
 Gravure Idol Report: Nana Ozaki  - At "Sponichi Annex", in November 2006

1982 births
Living people
People from Osaka Prefecture
Japanese gravure idols
Japanese actresses
Japanese television personalities